This is a list of roads designated A6.

 A006 road (Argentina), a road connecting Las Cuevas with the Christ the Redeemer monument in the border between Argentina and Chile
 A6 highway (Australia) may refer to :
 A6 (Sydney), a road connecting Carlingford and Heathcote
 A6 highway (Queensland), a road connecting Townsville and Cloncurry
 A6 highway (South Australia), a road connecting Adelaide with its airport
 A6 highway (Tasmania) may refer to :
 Huon Highway, a road connecting the south of Tasmania to the state capital - Hobart.
 Southern Outlet, a road connecting the Huon Highway and the Kingston Bypass to the Hobart CBD.
 Davey and Macquarie Streets form a Couplet through the Hobart CBD connecting the Southern Outlet with the A3 and (1) Highways.
 A6 motorway (Austria), a road connecting Slovakia to the Austrian motorway system
 A6 motorway (Bulgaria), a road connecting Sofia and Pernik
 A6 motorway (Croatia), a highway connecting Rijeka and Zagreb in Croatia
 A6 motorway (Cyprus), a road connecting Paphos to Limassol
 A6 motorway (France), a road connecting Paris and Lyon
 A6 motorway (Germany), a road connecting Saarbrücken near the French border and Waidhaus near the Czech border
 A6 motorway (Italy), a road connecting Turin and Savona
 A6 road (Latvia), a road connecting Riga and Daugavpils - Krāslava - Belarusian border (Pāternieki)
 A6 highway (Lithuania), a road connecting Kaunas and Zarasai–Daugavpils
 A6 motorway (Luxembourg), a road connecting the Belgian A4 to Luxembourg City
 A6 road (Malaysia), a road in Sabah
 A6 motorway (Netherlands), a road connecting the A1 motorway at interchange Muiderberg with the A7 motorway at interchange Joure

 A6 autostrada (Poland), a motorway near Szczecin
 A-6 motorway (Spain), a road connecting Madrid and A Coruña
 A 6 road (Sri Lanka), a road connecting Ambepussa and Trincomalee
 A6 road (United Kingdom) may refer to :
 A6 road (England), a road connecting Luton with Carlisle
 A6 road (Isle of Man), a road connecting Douglas with the A5
 A6 road (Northern Ireland), a road connecting Belfast with Derry
 A6 road (United States of America) may refer to :
 County Route A6 (California), a road in Tehama County connecting Dales (Malton Road) and Forward Road, crossed by State Route 36
 A6 road (Zimbabwe), a road connecting Beitbridge and Bulawayo
 A6 motorway (Romania), a road planned to connect Bucharest to Lugoj

See also
 List of highways numbered 6